In shogi, Double Side Pawn Capture (相横歩取り ai-yokofudori) is a Side Pawn Capture (Double Static Rook) opening in which both players capture each other's side pawn (as opposed to only Black taking White's side pawn) and White has exchanged bishops.

See also

 Side Pawn Capture
 Side Pawn Capture Bishop-33
 Static Rook

Bibliography

External links

 HIDETCHI's YouTube videos: Double Side Pawn Capture
 Yamajunn's Shogi Opening Traps: Ai Yokofutori Part 1
 Shogi Shack: Double Yokofu Dori 2

Shogi openings
Side Pawn Capture openings